Chendai may refer to the following locations in China:

 Chendai, Jinjiang, Fujian (陈埭镇), town
 Chendai, Yunxiao County (陈岱镇), town in Yunxiao County, Fujian